Suldalsposten (The Suldal Gazette) is a local Norwegian newspaper published in the municipality of Suldal in Rogaland county.

The paper covers events in the municipality of Suldal and its editorial offices are located in the administrative center of the municipality, Sand. The newspaper was established with municipal support in 1976. In 1998 and 2013, Suldalsposten was named Local Newspaper of the Year by the National Association of Local Newspapers. The paper is currently also distributed free to young people living outside the municipality for school, an apprenticeship, or military service. The paper is published once a week.

Circulation
According to the Norwegian Audit Bureau of Circulations and National Association of Local Newspapers, Suldalsposten has had the following annual circulation:
2004: 2,221
2005: 2,295
2006: 2,348
2007: 2,419
2008: 2,437
2009: 2,423
2010: 2,375
2011: 2,371
2012: 2,311
2013: 2,337
2014: 2,392
2015: 2,347
2016: 2,288

References

External links
Suldalsposten homepage

Newspapers published in Norway
Norwegian-language newspapers
Suldal
Mass media in Rogaland
Publications established in 1976
1976 establishments in Norway